The M141 Bunker Defeat Munition (BDM) is a disposable single-shot, shoulder-fired rocket launcher designed to defeat hardened structures. It is a modification of the United States Marine Corps Mk 153 Shoulder-Launched Multipurpose Assault Weapon (SMAW) and is also called the SMAW-D (where 'D' is for 'Disposable'). It was designed to fill the void in the United States Army inventory of a "bunker buster" weapon.

Design
The SMAW-D operates on the principle that the recoil created by launching the rocket is counteracted by a "backblast" of gases fired from the rear of the weapon. This makes the SMAW-D inherently dangerous, especially in confined, urban areas, as is with all weapons of this design. 

The warhead is the same High-explosive, dual-purpose (HEDP) as the USMC SMAW. It is effective against masonry and concrete bunkers and lightly armored vehicles.

The warhead is activated by a crush switch in its nose that can distinguish between hard and soft targets. On soft targets, such as sandbags, detonation is delayed until the projectile is buried in the target, producing a devastating effect. On hard targets, detonation occurs immediately on contact.

Service history
The conferees of the National Defense Authorization Act for Fiscal Year 1994 agreed that the US Army's BDM and the Marine Corps' Short-Range Assault Weapon (SRAW) were too similar to justify separate long-term projects, and that the Army should pursue an interim BDM program. Congress limited BDM procurement to 6,000 units.

Two candidates were evaluated for the Army's BDM program. A candidate from McDonnell-Douglas (later Talley Defense Systems) used the same warhead as the Marine Corps SMAW, but with a rocket motor with a shorter burn time. A candidate developed by Sweden's FFV for Alliant Techsystems (later Honeywell) replaced the standard high-explosive anti-tank (HEAT) warhead of the M136 AT4 with the same dual purpose warhead used by the USMC SMAW.

FFV designated the bunker buster version of the AT4 as the FFV AT8.  In 1996 the McDonnell-Douglas candidate was chosen. In a unique move, the US Army ordered one batch of 1,500 then a second batch of 4,500 which were placed in contingency storage for expedited issue to units in combat. The SMAW-D was delivered to the Army in 1999.

CNN news footage showed US Army Rangers firing M141s at various fortified caves during the Tora Bora operations against the Afghan Taliban and al Qaeda, being mistaken by the CNN reporters for M136 AT4 projectiles.

Quantities of M141s were sent to the Ukrainian armed forces by the U.S. before the invasion of Ukraine by Russia in February 2022. Since then, the missile has also been employed successfully against Russian vehicles.

Operators

Current operators
 : M141s were delivered amid the 2021–2022 Russo-Ukrainian crisis.

Gallery

References

External links

 SMAW-D - FAS Archived
 M141 Bunker Defeat Munition - Forecast International

Anti-fortification weapons
Rocket weapons of the United States
United States Army equipment
Military equipment introduced in the 1990s